The 2014–15 season was Coventry City's 95th season in The Football League and their third consecutive season in League One. In addition to League One, the Sky Blues also entered the Football League Cup, FA Cup and Football League Trophy competitions.

On 9 November 2014 Coventry were eliminated from the FA Cup in the 1st Round following a shock 2–1 home defeat to Football Conference North side Worcester City, and the second time they had lost to non-league opposition in 25 years following their defeat away to Sutton United in January 1989. This was in the wake of their 1st Round elimination from the Football League Cup in August, having lost 1–2 at home to Football League Championship side Cardiff City.

Review and events

Monthly events
21 August – Coventry City return to the Ricoh Arena following thirteen months playing at Northampton Town's Sixfields Stadium.

Squad details

* Player age and appearances/goals for the club as of beginning of 2014–15 season.

Matches

Preseason friendlies

League One

The fixtures for the 2014–15 season were announced on 18 June 2014 at 9am.

FA Cup

The draw for the first round of the FA Cup was made on 27 October 2014.

League Cup

The draw for the first round was made on 17 June 2014 at 10am. Coventry City were drawn at home to Cardiff City.

Football League Trophy

League One data

League table
A total of 24 teams contest the division: 17 sides remaining in the division from last season, three relegated from the Championship, and four promoted from League Two.

Results summary

Round by round

Scores overview

Season statistics

Appearances and goals

 

|-
|colspan="14"|Players who left before the season ended:

Goalscorers

Assists

Yellow cards

Red cards

Captains

Penalties awarded

Suspensions served

Monthly & weekly awards

End-of-season awards

International appearances

Overall

Transfers

Transfers in

Transfers out

Loans in

Loans out

Trials

References

External links
 Official Site: 2014–15
 BBC Sport – Club Stats
 Soccerbase – Results | Squad Stats | Transfers

Coventry City
Coventry City F.C. seasons